DMD may refer to:

Science and medicine 
 Dimethyldioxirane, an organic molecule
 Doctor of Dental Medicine, an academic degree for the profession of Dentistry
 Duchenne muscular dystrophy, a neurodegenerative disease
 Dysmyelogenic leukodystrophy, a neurodegenerative disease
 Dystrophin, a gene and protein involved in Duchenne muscular dystrophy

Technology
 Differential mode delay, a form of signal distortion in optical fiber
 Digital Message Device, a portable terminal which an artillery forward observer could use to communicate firing instructions
 Digital micromirror device, an optical semiconductor on which DLP technology is based
 Digital Multilayer Disk, the fluorescent multilayer optical disc format
 Direct Metal/Material Deposition, a multilayer cladding process where a precisely controlled laser beam is used to melt metal powders onto a substrate
 Dot Matrix Display, an information display device
 Dynamic mode decomposition, method to decompose experimental data into modes, resembling an empirical eigenvalue decomposition.
 Diamond Coin, a Cryptocurrency established in 2013.

Other 
 "Dante Must Die", the hardest difficulty in the Devil May Cry game series
 D (programming language)
 Delta Mu Delta, an international honor society
 Demand Media, a social media company's ticker symbol on NYSE
 Dendermonde, a city in Belgium
 Diet Mountain Dew, a sugar free soft drink
 Digital Media Design, an interdisciplinary undergraduate program at the University of Pennsylvania
 Draw Mohammed Day
 United States District Court for the District of Maryland
 Doomadgee Airport, IATA airport code "DMD"